A Silver Cross Mother is chosen each year by the Royal Canadian Legion to lay a wreath during the Remembrance Day ceremony at the National War Memorial in Ottawa on behalf of all mothers who have lost children in the service of their country. The title is named for the Silver Cross, a medal awarded to such mothers by the King or Queen of Canada.

List

References 
Veterans Affairs site

External links
 Reading and Remembrance 

Veterans' affairs in Canada
Awards established in the 20th century
Ceremonial occupations
Ceremonies in Canada
Motherhood
Annual events in Canada
Military traditions
Canadian traditions